The Fifth Avenue and North High Historic District is a historic district in the Short North neighborhood of Columbus, Ohio. It was listed on the National Register of Historic Places in 1990. The site consists of 24 buildings, including three that are non-contributing. Most are two-to-three story commercial brick buildings built between 1888 and 1930.

See also
 National Register of Historic Places listings in Columbus, Ohio

References

National Register of Historic Places in Columbus, Ohio
Historic districts on the National Register of Historic Places in Ohio
1990 establishments in Ohio
Historic districts in Columbus, Ohio